Nusret Yıldırım (born April 27, 1989) is a Turkish professional basketball player who plays as a power forward for Petkim Spor of the Turkish Basketball League.

External links
Nusret Yıldırım FIBA Profile
Nusret Yıldırım TBLStat.net Profile
Nusret Yıldırım Eurobasket Profile
Nusret Yıldırım TBL Profile

1989 births
Bandırma B.İ.K. players
Erdemirspor players
Galatasaray S.K. (men's basketball) players
Karşıyaka basketball players
Living people
Mersin Büyükşehir Belediyesi S.K. players
Basketball players from Istanbul
Petkim Spor players
Turkish men's basketball players
Türk Telekom B.K. players
Trabzonspor B.K. players
Power forwards (basketball)